The 2010 Canada Cup of Curling was held December 1–5, 2010 at the Medicine Hat Arena in Medicine Hat, Alberta. The Glenn Howard rink won their first Canada Cup on the men's side while Stefanie Lawton won her second cup. Glenn Howard's win marks the first time that a non-Alberta men's team won a Canada Cup.

Qualification

Women's
Defending champion: Shannon Kleibrink
2010 Scotties Tournament of Hearts champion: Jennifer Jones
Canadian Olympic Team: Cheryl Bernard
2010 Players' Champion: Cheryl Bernard (replaced by next best team on the 2009-10 CTRS ranking list, Kelly Scott)
2010 Curlers Corner Autumn Gold Curling Classic winner: Bingyu Wang (ineligible; replaced by next best team on the CTRS, Heather Nedohin)
2010 Manitoba Lotteries Women's Curling Classic winner: Chelsea Carey
2010 Southwestern Ontario Women's Charity Cashspiel winner: Shelley Nichols
2009-10 CTRS team: Amber Holland
2009-10 CTRS team: Stefanie Lawton
2009-10 CTRS team: Krista McCarville

Men's
Defending champion: Kevin Martin
2010 Tim Hortons Brier champion: Kevin Koe
Canadian Olympic Team: Kevin Martin (replaced by next best team on the 2009-10 CTRS ranking list, Glenn Howard)
2010 Players' Champion: Brad Gushue
2010 Westcoast Curling Classic winner: Kevin Martin (replaced by Mathew Camm)
2010 Cactus Pheasant Classic winner: Kevin Martin (replaced by Brent Bawel)
2010 Challenge Casino Lac Leamy winner: Serge Reid
2009-10 CTRS team: Jeff Stoughton
2009-10 CTRS team: Randy Ferbey (replaced by Rob Fowler)
2009-10 CTRS team: Mike McEwen

Men's

Teams

Round-robin standings

Round-robin results

Draw 2
Wednesday, December 1, 12:30 pm

Draw 4
Wednesday, December 1, 8:30 pm

Draw 5
Thursday, December 2, 9:00 am

Draw 6
Thursday, December 2, 1:30 pm

Draw 7
Thursday, December 2, 6:00 pm

Draw 8
Friday, December 3, 9:00 am

Draw 9
Friday, December 3, 1:30 pm

Draw 10
Friday, December 3, 6:00 pm

Tiebreaker
Friday, December 3, 9:30 pm

Playoffs

1 vs. 2
Saturday, December 4, 8:30 am

3 vs. 4
Saturday, December 4, 8:30 am

Semifinal
Saturday, December 4, 6:30 pm

Final
Sunday, December 5, 12:30 pm

Women's

Teams

Round-robin standings

Round-robin results

Draw 1
Wednesday, December 1, 8:30 am

Draw 3
Wednesday, December 1, 4:30 pm

Draw 5
Thursday, December 2, 9:00 am

Draw 6
Thursday, December 2, 1:30 pm

Draw 7
Thursday, December 2, 6:00 pm

Draw 8
Friday, December 3, 9:00 am

Draw 9
Friday, December 3, 1:30 pm

Draw 10
Friday, December 3, 6:00 pm

Playoffs

1 vs. 2
Saturday, December 4, 8:30 am

3 vs. 4
Saturday, December 4, 8:30 am

Semifinal
Saturday, December 4, 1:30 pm

Final
Sunday, December 5, 11:00 am

External links
Event site

Canada Cup Of Curling, 2010
Canada Cup (curling)
Sport in Medicine Hat
December 2010 sports events in Canada
Curling competitions in Alberta
2010 in Alberta